Finland–Japan relations are foreign relations between Finland and Japan. Japan first recognized Finland and established diplomatic relations in 1919. Diplomatic relations were temporarily broken in 1944 but were re-established again in 1957. Since, Finland and Japan have maintained good-natured relations, and have cooperation in places such as social welfare, science and technology and trade. In 2013 Japan Airlines started operating direct flights between Tokyo and Helsinki.

In May 2000 Emperor Akihito visitied Finland.

The Japanese also make up a large portion of tourists and expats in Finland, and is a popular holiday destination in Japan. The Finnish Moomin series has also been highly popular in Japan, particularly the 1990 TV adaptation.

History

1919-1944 

Despite a large geographical distance, Finland was seen as a friendly nation to Japan during this period. Mainly because there had not been any conflicts with the Finns, cultural contacts and because of the linguistical theory Ural-Altaic, which made people believe that Japanese and Finnish people were actually related. In this period only a few Japanese came to Finland, however Japanese newspapers published often had favourable articles on Finland, especially after the Winter War, articles about Finns being "heroic" were published. Some newspapers even said the Finns were similar in character and in race to the Japanese, and essentially Asians. Many Japanese individuals who had been in Finland made introductory sketches of Finnish culture which spoke very highly of Finns. There were some people in the Japanese army who wanted to conquer the Soviet far east and supported the Greater Finland idea.

After the Finns signed peace with the Soviet Union, diplomatic relations were severed, because of British pressure.

References

Finland–Japan relations